General von Below may refer to:

Ernst von Below (1863–1955), Prussian-born Imperial German Army general in World War I
Fritz von Below (1853–1918), Prussian-born Imperial German Army general in World War I
Gerd-Paul von Below (1892–1953), German Wehrmacht major general
Otto von Below (1857–1944), Prussian-born Imperial Imperial German Army general of infantry